The Van Trump Glacier is actually a scattering of glaciers and snowfields located on the southern flank of Mount Rainier in Washington. The glacier is located between the Wilson Glacier to the east and the Kautz Glacier to the west. Meltwater from the glacier drains into the Nisqually River.

See also
List of glaciers

References

Glaciers of Mount Rainier
Glaciers of Washington (state)